"Not in Nottingham" is a song from Walt Disney's animated film Robin Hood written and performed by Roger Miller. The performance by Miller, with narration provided by the minstrel rooster Alan-a-Dale, takes place in the rain while the poor are imprisoned. It is one of three songs sung in the film by Miller, the others being "Whistle-Stop" and "Oo-De-Lally".

The song was covered by Los Lobos for their 2009 album Los Lobos Goes Disney. Mumford & Sons also did a rendition of the song during their sessions with Daytrotter in 2012. Watkins Family Hour has long played the song as part of its live repertoire and released a studio version on their 2015 debut album.

References 

1973 songs
Culture in Nottingham
Disney songs
Depictions of Robin Hood in music
Roger Miller songs
Songs written by Roger Miller
Los Lobos songs
Mumford & Sons songs
Songs written for animated films
Songs about England
Songs about cities